Age & Scarpelli is the stage name used by the pair of Italian screenwriters Agenore Incrocci (1914–2005) and Furio Scarpelli (1919–2010). Together, they wrote the script for about a hundred movies, mainly satirical comedies.

The duo started working together in Totò cerca casa of 1949, and ended their collaboration in the 1980s. They worked for many famous Italian directors, like Sergio Leone (The Good, the Bad and the Ugly), Mario Monicelli (including their major work, L'armata Brancaleone), Dino Risi, Luigi Comencini, Pietro Germi and Ettore Scola and they wrote the dialogues of many Totò movies.

In 1985, they decided to part ways, and subsequently worked separately for movies such as Boom for Age and Il Postino for Scarpelli.

Age & Scarpelli are often considered the inventors of commedia all'italiana (Italian-style comedy).

Selected filmography
 Toto Looks for a House (1949) 
47 morto che parla (1950)
 Toto Looks for a Wife (1950)
 The Knight Has Arrived! (1950)
 Toto the Sheik (1950)
 Figaro Here, Figaro There (1950)
Totò terzo uomo (1951)
 Seven Hours of Trouble (1951)
Totò e le donne (1952)
 Toto in Color (1952) 
 The Enchanting Enemy (1953)
 Captain Phantom (1953)
 What Scoundrels Men Are! (1953)
 House of Ricordi (1954)
 Symphony of Love (1954)
Totò e Carolina (1955)
Don Camillo e l'onorevole Peppone (1955)
La banda degli onesti (1956)
Il bigamo (1956)
I soliti ignoti (1958)
La legge è legge (1958)
The Great War (1959)Audace colpo dei soliti ignoti (1959)Everybody Go Home (1960)
 The Passionate Thief (1960)Il mattatore (1960)Totò e Peppino divisi a Berlino (1962)La marcia su Roma (1962)Mafioso (1962)Il maestro di Vigevano (1963)I compagni (1963)I Mostri (1963)Seduced and Abandoned (1964)L'armata Brancaleone (1966)Il buono, il brutto, il cattivo (1966)Straziami, ma di baci saziami (1967)Brancaleone alle crociate (1970)In nome del popolo italiano (1971)Romanzo popolare (1974)C'eravamo tanto amati (1974)La terrazza'' (1980)

External links

20th-century Italian screenwriters
David di Donatello winners
Year of birth uncertain
2005 deaths
Screenwriting duos
20th-century Italian male writers